Rougemont is an unincorporated community and census-designated place (CDP) in Durham and Person counties, North Carolina, United States. The population of the CDP was 978 at the 2010 census. An act to incorporate Rougemont as a town was introduced to the North Carolina General Assembly in 2011.

Geography
Rougemont is located in northern Durham County along U.S. Route 501. The CDP extends north into Person County as far as the Flat River, east to Moores Mill Road, south to Quail Roost Farm Road, and west to Harris Road and Chambers Road. The Rougemont ZIP code covers a much larger area, extending west into Orange County and east into Granville County, but all population statistics are for the smaller CDP area.

Demographics

Points of interest
 Castle Mont Rouge, designed by Robert Mihaly

References

Census-designated places in North Carolina
Census-designated places in Durham County, North Carolina
Census-designated places in Person County, North Carolina
Unincorporated communities in Durham County, North Carolina
Unincorporated communities in Person County, North Carolina
Unincorporated communities in North Carolina